Oskil is a village in Izium  Raion, Kharkiv Oblast (province) of eastern Ukraine, near the right bank of the river Oskil. It is the administrative centre of Oskil rural hromada, one of the hromadas of Ukraine.

History 
In May 2022, the village was occupied by the forces of the Donetsk People's Republic, despite it not being in their claimed borders.However, the village had been recaptured by Ukraine in September 7 during the Eastern Counteroffensive.

References

Villages in Izium Raion
Izyumsky Uyezd